Ten individuals served as governors of Dakota Territory during its existence as an organized incorporated territory of the United States between March 2, 1861, and November 2, 1889, when the final extent of the reduced territory was split and admitted to the Union as the states of North and South Dakota. Additionally, one person served as provisional governor prior to, and one served as acting governor during this period. The territorial governor was appointed by the President of the United States and served at the president's pleasure.

Provisional governor
Though Dakota Territory did not officially come into existence until March 2, 1861, a provisional legislature formed in January 1859 and elected Wilmot Brookings as territorial governor. However, the federal government refused to acknowledge either the provisional government or its territorial governor as official.

Territorial governors

Governors after statehood

References

Dakota Territory
Governors of Dakota Territory
Governors of Dakota Territory
Governors of Dakota Territory